"Where I'll Stay" is a song by Australian recording artist Jessica Mauboy. It was released digitally on 11 March 2016. The song was released as the Australian theme song for the 2016 Olympic Games.

Mauboy told Sunrise the song "came from the heart", adding "I wanted to do something that was empowering and fearless and something that makes you feel triumphant and strong" adding the song fit right for the Olympics.

Music video
A music video produced by Network 7 was released featuring Australian Olympians lip-syncing to the song. The video features athletes from across the sports of rugby, synchronized swimming, women's football (soccer) and water polo teams as well as with athletes from the Australian swimming, BMX, athletics, and cycling programs.

Track listing
Digital download
"Where I'll Stay" – 3:33

Charts

Release history

References

2016 songs
2016 singles
Jessica Mauboy songs
Songs written by Jessica Mauboy
Songs written by David Musumeci
Songs written by Anthony Egizii
Olympic theme songs
Sony Music Australia singles
Songs written by Sarah Aarons